Kenny Chidozie Anunike (born May 22, 1990) is a former American football defensive end and current football coach. He played college football at Duke. After going undrafted Kenny spent two years with the Denver Broncos whom with which he won Super Bowl 50 with the team. In addition he spent a pre-season on the New York Jets roster. In 2017 Kenny began coaching as a graduate assistant coach at Ohio State University. Following three years in as a graduate assistant, Kenny became the defensive line coach for the Fordham Rams.

College career
During his four-year career at Duke, he totaled 148 tackles, 26 tackles for a loss, 4 forced fumbles, and 15 sacks. His best season came in 2013 when he totaled 67 tackles, 13.5 tackles for a loss, and 6 sacks. While at Duke, he was known as the "Night Train".

Professional career

Denver Broncos
Anunike was signed as an undrafted free agent by the Broncos on May 12, 2014. He spent his rookie year in 2014 on injured reserve due to an elbow injury after competing with the Broncos during the preseason.

In 2015, Anunike played in three games. On February 7, 2016, Anunike was part of the Broncos team that won Super Bowl 50. In the game, the Broncos defeated the Carolina Panthers by a score of 24–10. Anunike did not play in the game because he was on injured reserve. He was waived by the Broncos on August 8, 2016.

New York Jets
On December 12, 2016, Anunike was signed to the Jets' practice squad. He signed a reserve/future contract with the Jets on January 2, 2017. On April 27, 2017, Anunike was waived by the Jets.

Coaching career

Ohio State Buckeyes 
Anunike joined the Ohio State coaching staff in early 2017 as a graduate assistant. He served as an assistant to defensive line coach Larry Johnson.

Fordham Rams
Kenny was named the Defensive Line Coach & Co- Defensive Coordinator at Fordham University in April 2020.

References

External links
Denver Broncos bio

1990 births
Living people
American football defensive ends
Denver Broncos players
Duke Blue Devils football players
New York Jets players
People from Lewis Center, Ohio
Players of American football from Ohio